A Diamond Is a Hard Rock is the second album by the American rock band Legs Diamond.

Track listing 

 2018 Rock Candy Records CD version bonus tracks

 "High School Queen" (Demo)
 "Teaser" (Demo)
 "It Takes More Soul (To Rock & Roll)" (Demo)
 "Stumbler" (Demo)
 "Showtime In Chicago" (Demo)
 "Evil" (Demo)

Personnel 

 Legs Diamond

 Rick Sanford – lead vocals, flute, percussion
 Roger Romeo – lead guitar, lead vocals
 Michael Prince – rhythm guitar, keyboards, vocals
 Michael "Diamond" Gargano – bass guitar
 Jeff Poole – drums, percussion

 Production

 Eddie Leonetti – producer
 Lee Decarlo – engineer

References 

1977 albums
Mercury Records albums